Antonio Borrometi (27 May 1953 – 19 January 2022) was an Italian politician. He died on 19 January 2022, at the age of 68.

References

1953 births
2022 deaths
20th-century Italian politicians
21st-century Italian politicians
Deputies of Legislature XIII of Italy
Members of the Sicilian Regional Assembly
Christian Democracy (Italy) politicians
Italian People's Party (1994) politicians
Democracy is Freedom – The Daisy politicians
People from Modica